Charles Lucas (28 July 1808 – 23 March 1869) was an English composer, cellist, conductor, publisher and from 1859 to 1866 third principal of the Royal Academy of Music.

Life and career
Lucas was born in Salisbury, the son of a music-seller. After receiving a musical education as a chorister at Salisbury Cathedral between 1815 and 1823 he attended the newly formed Royal Academy of Music (RAM) in London, where he studied the cello under Robert Lindley and composition under the principal, William Crotch. While a student he won several prizes, became head boy and was made a sub-professor of composition in 1824. Among those he taught was William Sterndale Bennett, who four decades later succeeded him as principal of the academy. In later years Lucas taught two other musicians who eventually headed the RAM: George Macfarren and Alexander Mackenzie. The latter recalled that Lucas had been an outstanding teacher of counterpoint.

After leaving the academy in 1830 Lucas was appointed to Queen Adelaide's private band, and became music tutor to Prince George (later Duke) of Cambridge and the princes of Saxe-Weimar. He performed in London orchestras, eventually succeeding Lindley as the leading cellist at Covent Garden and other ensembles. He was devoted to chamber music, and participated in the British premieres of chamber works including Beethoven's late string quartets.

In 1832 Cipriani Potter, conductor of the orchestra at the RAM, succeeded Crotch as principal; Lucas was appointed to the post vacated by Potter. In this capacity he directed two performances of Beethoven's Symphony No 9 in 1835 and 1836. The Times praised the performances and hoped that the academy's efforts would spur the Philharmonic Society into presenting the work at its concerts.  Lucas later conducted for the society and other concert promoters. He served as a director of the society from 1856 to 1869, during Bennett's term as conductor of its orchestra.

In his history of the RAM (1922) Frederick Corder wrote: "In July [1858] Cipriani Potter resigned, on the plea of old age and infirmity. He was a good and conscientious man rather than an able one, loved by his subordinates, the best of whom, Charles Lucas – who had served him faithfully and earnestly begged him not to retire – was elected Principal in his place." Corder commented that Lucas

The finances of the academy had been precarious from its inception, and did not improve during Lucas's seven years in office. His successor, Bennett, had to rescue the institution from imminent dissolution. On the musical side, Corder describes Lucas's tenure as the least interesting period in the RAM's history, but Lucas was well regarded to the extent that a fund was set up in his honour to endow an annual "Charles Lucas Medal", given to the RAM student judged to have written the best musical composition. Among its recipients have been Arnold Bax, Richard Rodney Bennett, Dora Bright, Guirne Creith, Edward German, Arthur Goring Thomas, Joseph Holbrooke, Emma Lomax and Stewart Macpherson.

With Robert Addison and John Hollier, Lucas was a partner in the music publishing firm Addison, Hollier and Lucas, which flourished between 1856 and 1863 with its premises at 210 Regent Street, and later at 11 Little Marlborough Street. The firm published most of the operas by Macfarren, Michael Balfe, William Vincent Wallace, and Julius Benedict, business gained through its close association with the Pyne and Harrison Opera Company.

Ill health led Lucas to retire from the RAM in 1866. He died three years later at his home in Wandsworth, London, at the age of 60.

Music
Lucas's compositions included three symphonies, overtures, string quartets (including the String Quartet in G major, 1827), anthems and songs. The three Sinfonias, each with four movements, are student works written before he became conductor of the Royal Academy of Music orchestra in 1832. Jürgen Schaarwächter highlights the "lively and charming" minuets of the second and third Sinfonias in the tradition of Haydn and Mozart, and the finale of the third: "a short, spirited conclusion to Lucas's symphonic output, which resembles some of Schubert's earlier symphonies (which were certainly not known to Lucas)".

He also wrote an opera, The Regicide, to a libretto by Metastasio translated by Thomas Oliphant, the overture to which The Times described as "a spirited composition, very noisy and without any great originality". Not long before the composer's death an overture, Rosenwald, was performed by the Philharmonic Society at the Hanover Square Rooms in London on 8 June 1868. The Philharmonic Society performed several other of his works during his lifetime, including the second and third symphonies and the Regicide overture. As editor Lucas prepared a performing version of Esther for the Handel Society.

Selected works
 1826 – Sinfonia No 1 in C (revised 1834)
 1827 – String Quartet in G major
 1829 – Sinfonia No 2 in A
 1830 – Sinfonia No 3 in Bb major
 1840 – The Regicide, opera
 1868 – Overture Rosenwald

Notes

Sources
 
 
  
 Schaarwächter,  Jürgen (2015). Two Centuries of British Symphonism: From the beginnings to 1945, Georg Olms Verlag AG

External links
Cello Playing in 19th Century, England and Scandinavia
 Recording of String Quartet in G major (1827) by Steve's Bedroom Band, IMSLP

1808 births
1869 deaths
19th-century English musicians
Academics of the Royal Academy of Music
Alumni of the Royal Academy of Music
English classical cellists
Principals of the Royal Academy of Music
19th-century classical musicians